Dicyrtoma flammea is a species of globular springtails in the family Dicyrtomidae.

References

Collembola
Articles created by Qbugbot
Animals described in 1951